Caterham Common near Caterham in Surrey was the venue for three historic cricket matches played from 1767 to 1769. In the 18th century, it was the home venue of the Caterham Cricket Club, run by Henry Rowett.

References

1765 establishments in England
Cricket grounds in Surrey
Defunct cricket grounds in England
Defunct sports venues in Surrey
English cricket venues in the 18th century
Sport in Surrey
Sports venues completed in 1765
Tandridge